Intolerance is a 1916 epic silent film directed by D. W. Griffith. Subtitles include Love's Struggle Throughout the Ages and A Sun-Play of the Ages.

Regarded as one of the most influential films of the silent era (though it received mixed reviews at the time), the three-and-a-half-hour epic intercuts four parallel storylines, each separated by several centuries: first, a contemporary melodrama of crime and redemption; second, a Judean story: Christ's mission and death; third, a French story: the events surrounding the St. Bartholomew's Day massacre of 1572; and fourth, a Babylonian story: the fall of the Babylonian Empire to Persia in 539 BC. Each story had its own distinctive color tint in the original print. The scenes are linked by shots of a figure representing Eternal Motherhood, rocking a cradle.

Griffith chose to explore the theme of intolerance partly in response to his previous film The Birth of a Nation (1915) being derided by the NAACP and others for perpetuating and supporting racial stereotypes and glorifying the Ku Klux Klan. Intolerance was not, however, an apology, as Griffith felt he had nothing to apologize for; in numerous interviews, Griffith made clear that the film was a rebuttal to his critics and he felt that they were, in fact, the intolerant ones. In the years following its release, Intolerance strongly influenced European film movements. In 1958, the film was voted number 7 on the Brussels 12 list at the 1958 World Expo. In 1989, it was one of the first films to be selected for preservation in the United States National Film Registry.

Storylines 

The film consists of four distinct, but parallel, stories—intercut with increasing frequency as the film builds to a climax—that demonstrate humankind's persistent intolerance throughout the ages. The timeline covers approximately 2,500 years.

 The ancient "Babylonian" story (539 BC) depicts the conflict between Prince Belshazzar of Babylon and Cyrus the Great of Persia. The fall of Babylon is a result of intolerance arising from a conflict between devotees of two rival Babylonian gods—Bel-Marduk and Ishtar.
 The Biblical "Judean" story (c. AD 27) recounts how—after the Wedding at Cana and the Woman Taken in Adultery—intolerance led to the Crucifixion of Jesus. This sequence is the shortest of the four.
 The Renaissance "French" story (1572) tells of the religious intolerance that led to the St. Bartholomew's Day Massacre of Protestant Huguenots fomented by the Catholic Royal House of Valois.
 The American "Modern" story (c. 1914) demonstrates how crime, moral puritanism, and conflicts between ruthless capitalists and striking workers help ruin the lives of marginalized Americans. To get more money for his spinster sister's charities, a mill owner orders a 10% pay cut to his workers' wages. An ensuing workers' strike is crushed and The Boy and The Dear One make their way to another city; she lives in poverty and he turns to crime. After they marry, he tries to break free of crime but is framed for theft by his ex-boss. While he is in prison, his wife must endure their child being taken away by the same "moral uplift society" that instigated the strike. Upon his release from prison, he discovers his ex-boss attempting to rape his wife. A struggle begins and in the confusion the girlfriend of the boss shoots and kills the boss. She escapes and The Boy is convicted and sentenced to the gallows. A kindly policeman helps The Dear One find the real killer and together they try to reach the Governor in time so her reformed husband will not be hanged.

Breaks between differing time periods are marked by the symbolic image of a mother rocking a cradle, representing the passing of generations. The film simultaneously cross-cuts back and forth and interweaves the segments over great gaps of space and time, with over 50 transitions between the segments. One of the unusual characteristics of the film is that many of the characters do not have names. Griffith wished them to be emblematic of human types. Thus, the central female character in the modern story is called The Dear One, her young husband is called The Boy, and the leader of the local Mafia is called The Musketeer of the Slums. Critics and film theorists maintain that these names reveal Griffith's sentimentalism, which was already hinted at in The Birth of a Nation, with names such as The Little Colonel.

Cast 

 Lillian Gish as The Eternal Motherhood
The American "Modern" story

 Mae Marsh as The Dear One
 Robert Harron as The Boy, a worker at Jenkins Mill
 Fred Turner as The Dear One's father, a worker at the Jenkins Mill
 Miriam Cooper as The Friendless One, former neighbor of the Boy and Dear One
 Walter Long as Musketeer of the Slums
 Tom Wilson as The Kindly Officer/Heart
 Vera Lewis as Miss Mary T. Jenkins
 Sam De Grasse as Mr. Arthur Jenkins, mill boss
 Lloyd Ingraham as The Judge
 Ralph Lewis as The Governor
 A. W. McClure as Prison Father Fathley
 Max Davidson as tenement neighbor of Dear One
Renaissance "French" story (1572)

 Margery Wilson as Brown Eyes
 Eugene Pallette as Prosper Latour
 Spottiswoode Aitken as Brown Eyes' father
 Ruth Handforth as Brown Eyes' mother
 Allan Sears as The Mercenary Soldier
 Josephine Crowell as Catherine de Medici, the Queen-mother
 Frank Bennett as Charles IX of France
 Maxfield Stanley as Prince Henry of France
 Joseph Henabery as Admiral Coligny
 Constance Talmadge as Princess Marguerite of Valois (first role in film)
 W. E. Lawrence as Henry of Navarre
Ancient "Babylonian" story

 Constance Talmadge as The Mountain Girl (second role in film)
 Elmer Clifton as The Rhapsode, a warrior-singer
 Alfred Paget as Prince Belshazzar
 Seena Owen as The Princess Beloved, favorite of Belshazzar
 Tully Marshall as High Priest of Bel-Marduk
 George Siegmann as Cyrus the Great
 Carl Stockdale as King Nabonidus, father of Belshazzar
 Elmo Lincoln as The Mighty Man of Valor, guard to Belshazzar
 Frank Brownlee as The Mountain Girl's brother
 The Ruth St. Denis Dancers as Dancing girls
The Biblical "Judean" story

 Howard Gaye as The Nazarene
 Lillian Langdon as Mary, the Mother
 Bessie Love as The Bride
 George Walsh as The Bridegroom
Cameo appearances/small roles

 Mary Alden
 Frank Borzage
 Tod Browning (Crook)
 Frank Campeau
 Jewel Carmen
 Constance Collier
 Donald Crisp
 Carol Dempster
 Douglas Fairbanks (drunken soldier with monkey)
 Mildred Harris (Favorite of the harem)
 Dell Henderson
 Harold Lockwood
 Wilfred Lucas
 Francis McDonald
 Owen Moore
 Carmel Myers
 Wallace Reid
 Eve Southern
 Pauline Starke
 Erich von Stroheim (Second Pharisee)
 Madame Sul-Te-Wan
 Natalie Talmadge
 Ethel Grey Terry
 Herbert Beerbohm Tree
 King Vidor
John P. McCarthy (Prison Guard)

Production 

Intolerance was a colossal undertaking featuring monumental sets, lavish period costumes, and more than 3,000 extras. The total payroll for extras was reported to have reached $12,000 daily. Griffith began shooting the film with the Modern Story (originally titled "The Mother and the Law"), whose planning predated the great commercial success of The Birth of a Nation. He then greatly expanded it to include the other three parallel stories under the theme of intolerance. Three hundred thousand feet of film were shot.

The total cost of producing Intolerance was reported to be close to $2 million including $250,000 for the Belshazzar feast scene alone, an astronomical sum in 1916, but accounts for the film show the exact cost to be $385,906.77. A third of the budget went into making the Babylonian segments of the film.

Reception 

Intolerance was met with an enthusiastic reception from film critics upon its premiere. Scholar Frank Beaver argues that "Griffith's intended message in Intolerance was not lost on reviewers", noting that in The San Francisco Bulletin a contemporary critic declared, "Griffith's film comes powerfully to strengthen the hand of the believers in love." Although Intolerance was a commercial failure upon its initial release, it has since received very positive reviews and later gained popularity. It has been called "the only film fugue". Theodore Huff, one of the leading film critics of the first half of the 20th century, believed that it was the only motion picture worthy of taking its place alongside Beethoven's Symphony No. 5, Michelangelo's Sistine Chapel ceiling paintings, etc., as a separate and central artistic contribution.

Intolerance was shown out of competition at the 1982 Cannes Film Festival. In 1989, it was selected for preservation in the United States National Film Registry by the Library of Congress as being "culturally, historically, or aesthetically significant", the first year of voting. In 2007, AFI's 100 Years ... 100 Movies (10th Anniversary Edition) ranked Intolerance as the 49th best American film of all time. The film also holds a 97% approval rating on the aggregation site Rotten Tomatoes.

Critic Armond White considers Intolerance the greatest film ever made, writing, "A century later we are as close to its subject as we are distant from its art." Praise for the work is not unanimous, however. David Thomson argued that the film's impact is weakened by its "self-destructive frenzy":

The film has been widely reported to have been a box office bomb, but this is a myth attributed to its misreported budget. Even though up to that time it was the most expensive American film made, and it did far less business than The Birth of a Nation, it earned approximately $1 million for its backers, a respectable performance and enough to recoup its budget.

Influence 

Intolerance and its unorthodox editing were enormously influential, particularly among European and Soviet filmmakers. Many of the numerous assistant directors Griffith employed in making the film—Erich von Stroheim, Tod Browning, Woody Van Dyke—went on to become important and noted Hollywood directors in subsequent years.

The film was parodied by Buster Keaton in Three Ages (1923).

Intolerances "Babylon" set is a feature location in the 2011 video game L.A. Noire, even though the game is set in 1947 and the Babylon set was torn down before this date.

 Versions 

Intolerance is now in the public domain. There are currently four major versions of the film in circulation on home video.

 The Killiam Shows Version – Taken from a third-generation 16 millimeter print, this version contains an organ score by Gaylord Carter. Running approximately 176 minutes, it is the version that has been the most widely seen in recent years. It has been released on LaserDisc and DVD by Image Entertainment and is the most complete version currently available on home video, if not the longest.
 The Official Thames Silents Restoration – In 1989 this film was given a formal restoration by film preservationists Kevin Brownlow and David Gill. This version, also running 177 minutes, was prepared by Thames Television from original 35 millimeter material, and its tones and tints were restored per Griffith's original intent. It also has a digitally recorded orchestral score by Carl Davis. It was released the same year on VHS in the US by HBO Video, then went out of print. This version is part of the Rohauer Collection. The Rohauer company worked in association with Thames on the restoration. It was given a further digital restoration by Cohen Media Group (which currently serves as keeper of the Rohauer library, and is the copyright holder on this restored version), and was reissued to select theatres, as well as on DVD and Blu-ray, in 2013. It is distributed under the Masters of Cinema label in Europe. While not as complete as the Killiam Shows Version, this print contains footage not found on that particular print.
 The Kino Version – Pieced together in 2002 by Kino International, this version, taken from 35 millimeter material, is transferred at a slower frame rate than the Killiam Shows and Rohauer prints, resulting in a longer running time of 197 minutes. It contains a synthetic orchestral score by Joseph Turrin. An alternative "happy ending" to the "Fall of Babylon" sequence, showing the Mountain Girl surviving and re-united with the Rhapsode, is included on the DVD as a supplement. Despite the longer runtime, this version is less complete than the Killiam Shows and Rohauer prints.
 The Restored Digital Cinema Version''' – Restoration conducted by ZZ Productions in collaboration with the Danish Film Institute and Arte France of the version shown at the Theatre Royal, Drury Lane in London on April 7, 1917. This version runs approximately 177 minutes, and premiered at the Venice Film Festival on August 29, 2007, and on arte on October 4, 2007.

A further extensive 1989 restoration was a collaboration between silent film composer-conductor Gillian Anderson, the Museum of Modern Art and the Library of Congress. It is somewhat controversial but perhaps the most accurate to date; however, it is unavailable on home video.

There are other budget/public domain video and DVD versions of this film released by different companies, each with varying degrees of picture quality depending on the source that was used. Most are of poor picture quality, but even the restored 35 millimeter versions exhibit considerable film damage.

The Internet Movie Database lists the standard running time as 163 minutes, which is the running length of the DVD released by "Public Domain Flicks". The Delta DVD released in Region 1 as Intolerance: A Sun Play of the Ages and in Region 2 as Intolerance: Love's Struggle Throughout the Ages clocks in at 167 minutes. The version available for free viewing on the Internet Movie Archive is the Killiam restoration.

Cameraman Karl Brown remembered a scene with the various members of the Babylonian harem that featured full frontal nudity. He was barred from the set that day, apparently because he was so young. While there are several shots of slaves and harem girls throughout the film (which were shot by another director without Griffith's involvement), the scene that Brown describes is not in any surviving versions.

It is also known that a major segment of the Renaissance "French" story, involving the attempted assassination of the Admiral Coligny, was cut before the film's release.

Film historian Kevin Brownlow has written that, when Griffith re-released "The Modern Story" separately as The Mother and the Law'' in 1919, he softened  in the film, due to the First Red Scare that year. "He was obliged to put this title in the strike sequence: 'The militiamen having used blank cartridges, the workmen now fear only the company guards. In fact, "machine guns could not operate with blank cartridges at this period", Brownlow noted.

References

Further reading

External links 

 
 
 
 
 
 
 

1916 films
1916 drama films
1910s avant-garde and experimental films
American silent feature films
American epic films
Silent American drama films
American black-and-white films
American avant-garde and experimental films
Films about prejudice
Cultural depictions of Belshazzar
Cultural depictions of Catherine de' Medici
Cultural depictions of Cyrus the Great
Nabonidus
Religious epic films
Portrayals of Jesus in film
Films about capital punishment
Films critical of religion
Films set in the 6th century BC
Films set in the 1st century
Films set in the 1570s
Films set in the 1910s
Films set in Babylon
Films set in the Roman Empire
Triangle Film Corporation films
Films directed by D. W. Griffith
United States National Film Registry films
Articles containing video clips
Portrayals of the Virgin Mary in film
Surviving American silent films
Inanna
Cultural depictions of Henry III of France
Films about religious violence
Films about labor relations
Films about organized crime in the United States
1910s American films